Hydroxyanthracenes are a class of natural phenolic compounds. They can be found in Cassia alata and Cassia senna (sennosides A, B, C and D).

References 

Natural phenols